Tan Tan may refer to:
Tan-Tan Province, in southern Morocco
Tan-Tan, a city in Morocco
Tan-tan, a small drum
Eddie Thornton, Jamaican trumpeter known by his nickname "Tan Tan"